Jhon Alejandro Perlaza Zapata (born 26 August 1994 in Cali) is a Colombian sprinter. He competed in the men's 4 × 400 metres relay at the 2016 Summer Olympics. He competed at the 2020 Summer Olympics.

References

External links
 
 
 

1994 births
Living people
Colombian male sprinters
Olympic athletes of Colombia
Athletes (track and field) at the 2016 Summer Olympics
Sportspeople from Cali
South American Games bronze medalists for Colombia
South American Games medalists in athletics
Competitors at the 2014 South American Games
Athletes (track and field) at the 2019 Pan American Games
Pan American Games gold medalists for Colombia
Pan American Games medalists in athletics (track and field)
Medalists at the 2019 Pan American Games
Central American and Caribbean Games medalists in athletics
Athletes (track and field) at the 2020 Summer Olympics
Liberty University alumni
Liberty Flames and Lady Flames athletes
20th-century Colombian people
21st-century Colombian people